Gosforth House now known as Brandling House is a Grade II listed building built as a mansion house and now serving as a hospitality and conference centre at Gosforth Park Racecourse, Newcastle upon Tyne, England.

History 
The house was built between 1755 and 1764 for Charles Brandling (1733–1802) to a design by architect James Paine. Brandling also laid out the park and a  lake.

Charles John Brandling (1769–1826) suffered financial problems as a result of which the estate was sold, in 1852, to Thomas Smith. A fire started by suffragettes in 1914 destroyed the interior of the property. Restoration of the house took place in 1921.

References

External links 
 British Listed Buildings, Gosforth House

Grade II listed buildings in Tyne and Wear
History of Tyne and Wear
Country houses in Tyne and Wear